Pape Malickou Diakhaté (born 21 June 1984) is a Senegalese former professional footballer who played as a central defender.

Club career
Diakhaté was born in Dakar, Senegal. Having come through the Nancy youth ranks, he made his Ligue 2 debut on 20 October 2001, playing the first half of the 2–0 win over LB Châteauroux. He played 25 league matches the following season, and appeared regularly for the club, although his 2003–04 season was severely disrupted by injury. 2004–05 brought Diakhaté favourable recognition, winning a place in France Football's team of the season.

On 18 July 2007, it was announced that Diakhaté had signed a contract with Ukrainian club Dynamo Kyiv for a €4 million transfer fee. He made his debut for Dynamo on 1 August 2007 in a league fixture against FC Chornomorets Odessa. He quickly established himself in the first team and even captained the club on occasion. A month later, on 1 September, he broke a collar bone in a match against FC Kharkiv, but once recovered returned to the team. On 16 December 2009, he left Dynamo Kyiv, and returned to France signing a half-year loan contract with AS Saint-Étienne. The following season he was loaned to Lyon.

On 26 August 2011, Diakhaté signed for Spanish club Granada CF, for a club record transfer fee of €4.5 million on a four-year contract.

In January 2016, he joined former club AS Nancy signing a contract until the end of the season. Having made few appearances due to back problems, he left the club at the end of his contract.

In August 2017, after a year without a club, Diakhaté signed with fifth-tier side FC Lunéville. He played for the club on the first four matchdays before being reported as injured. In October, he agreed to the termination of his contract.

International career
In 2004 Diakhaté earned a full international call-up from Senegal. After Nancy's promotion to Ligue 1 in 2005, Diakhaté was also part of the Senegalese team that finished fourth in the 2006 African Cup of Nations.

Position
Originally a left-back and capable of playing as a wide midfielder, he is recognised mainly as a centre-back. He has also been known to play in goal for Senegal on numerous occasions.

Career statistics

References

External links
 
 
 
 
 

1984 births
Living people
Footballers from Dakar
Senegalese footballers
Association football defenders
AS Nancy Lorraine players
AS Saint-Étienne players
Olympique Lyonnais players
FC Dynamo Kyiv players
Granada CF footballers
Ligue 1 players
Ligue 2 players
Ukrainian Premier League players
La Liga players
Senegal international footballers
Senegalese expatriate footballers
Expatriate footballers in France
Expatriate footballers in Ukraine
Expatriate footballers in Spain
Expatriate footballers in Turkey
2012 Africa Cup of Nations players
Senegalese expatriate sportspeople in France
Senegalese expatriate sportspeople in Ukraine
Senegalese expatriate sportspeople in Spain
Senegalese expatriate sportspeople in Turkey